Steve Simske (born 1964 in San Diego, United States), also known as Steven J. Simske,  is an American engineer and scientist specialized in biomedical engineering, cybersecurity, anti-counterfeiting, Variable data printing, imaging, and robotics. He is a full professor of systems engineering  at the Walter Scott Jr. School of Engineering of Colorado State University.

Education and career 
Simske received a B.S. in. Bioengineering and Biomedical Engineering from  Marquette University in 1986, and  a M.S. also in  bioengineering from Rensselaer Polytechnic Institute in 1987. He then received in 1990 a Ph.D. in Electrical Engineering  from  the University of Colorado in Boulder.  This was followed by two post docs  from the same university,  one in electrical and computer engineering in 1991 and one in aerospace engineering in 1993.

Simske was research professor at the University of Colorado from 1994 to 2007. He joined HP in 1994, then HP Labs in 2000, where he  founded  the  security printing and imaging lab of which he was the director from 2004 to 2018. He was named a HP fellow in 2011.

Simske is an IEEE Fellow for contributions to anti-counterfeiting and cyber-physical security. He is an Honorary Professor of the University of Nottingham, and a 2015  recipient of the Robert F. Reed Award. He is a fellow of the Society for Imaging Science and Technology, and was its president from 2017 to 2019. He is chair of the steering committee  for the ACM DocEng Symposium.   He is a fellow of the National Academy of Inventors.

Books 
 Simske, Steve, Meta-Algorithmics: Patterns for Robust, Low Cost, High Quality Systems, Wiley-IEEE Press, 2013. 
 Simske, Steve. Meta-Analytics: Consensus Approaches and System Patterns for Data Analysis. Elsevier, 2018. 
 Mayer, Joceli; Borges, Paulo, and Simske, Steve.  Fundamentals and Applications of Hardcopy Communication: Conveying Side Information by Printed Media. Springer, 2018.  
 Simske, Steve and Vans, Marie. Functional Applications of Text Analytics Systems. River Publishers Series in Document Engineering, 2021.

See also 

 List of prolific inventors

References

External links 

Steve Simske's publications indexed by Google Scholar
Steve Simske's publications indexed by DBLP
Steve Simske's US patents

Living people
1964 births
21st-century American inventors